Kormikha is a rural locality (a selo) in Simonovsky Selsoviet, Uglovsky District, Altai Krai, Russia. The population was 59 as of 2013. It was founded in 1840. There is 1 street.

Geography 
Kormikha is located 48 km north of Uglovskoye (the district's administrative centre) by road. Chernokorovnikovo is the nearest rural locality.

References 

Rural localities in Uglovsky District, Altai Krai